Phyllonorycter rhynchosiae is a moth of the family Gracillariidae. It is known from South Africa. The habitat consists of the urban hills of Pretoria.

The length of the forewings is 3–3.3 mm. The forewing is elongate and the ground colour is golden ochreous with some white scales at the base. The hindwings are pale greyish and slightly shiny. Adults are on wing from early January to mid-March and from early June to mid-August.

The larvae feed on Eriosema psoraleoides, Rhynchosia confusa and Rhynchosia nitens. They mine the leaves of their host plant. The mine has the form of a rather small, oval, semi-transparent, tentiform mine on the underside of the leaf.

References

Endemic moths of South Africa
Moths described in 1961
rhynchosiae
Moths of Africa